Joseph William Simpson (1879–1939) was a British painter and etcher of portraits and sporting subjects, and a magazine illustrator.

Biography 
Simpson was born in Carlisle, Cumberland, in 1879. He attended the Glasgow School of Art and initially worked in Edinburgh as an illustrator and cartoonist. He 
was the editor of The Book of Bookplates (1900-1903), Books and Bookplates (1903-04) and the later publication The Book-Lovers' Magazine. In 1901 he was the co-author with Wilbur Macey Stone of The Purple Book of Book-plates, which was published in New York. He was employed by the publishers T. N. Foulis as a typeface designer and also designed some covers and bookplates in chapbook style. In 1905, Simpson came to London, working for the press doing poster designs and doing oil paintings in his spare time. His studio was next door to that of Frank Brangwyn who in 1909 encouraged Simpson to do his first etching. He taught for a while at the London School of Art and in 1918, became an official war artist with the Royal Air Force, spending time stationed in France. His first exhibition of etchings took place in Glasgow at Wishart Brown in March 1926, and this was followed in November by a very successful London exhibition, staged by Alex, Reid & Lefevre. He also exhibited in Munich, Venice, Florence and Stockholm. He died in London in 1939.

Bibliography 
 Granville Fell, H. "The Etched Work of Joseph Simpson." The Print Collector’s Quarterly Vol 19 (1932): 212-233 a catalogue of 74 etchings (up to 1931).

Notes

External links 
 cybermuse to search the National Gallery of Canada collection
 www.artistarchive.com  Fell’s catalogue listing of over 70 prints.

1879 births
1939 deaths
Sports artists
People from Carlisle, Cumbria
English etchers
English portrait painters
20th-century English painters
English male painters
20th-century British printmakers
20th-century English male artists